Ahmed Jdey (Haïdra, June 10, 1951 – July 20, 2012) was a Tunisian author, historian, and professor.

Early life 
Jdey was born on June 10, 1951, in Haidra. He finished his secondary studies in Manssoura in Kairouan by obtaining the baccalaureate Literature in 1972. He attended Nice University in France, where he earned a Doctorate degree in history in 1987. His thesis was entitled "ibn Abi Diyaf: his work and thought".

Career 
For four years, Jdey served as a member of the faculty of Tunis University, where he taught history. In 1987, he joined the faculty of Nice University.

Published works 
 Jdey, Ahmed (1977). Conflict
 Jdey, Ahmed (2000). Memory of the silence

References

External links 
 
 Interview of Ahmed Jdey

20th-century Tunisian historians
1951 births
2012 deaths
Tunisian writers
University of Kairouan alumni
Academic staff of Tunis University
Academic staff of Côte d'Azur University